Jiangmen Prison is a prison in the Jiangmen District of the county-level city of Heshan in Jiangmen City, Guangdong Province, China. Established in 1951, inmates work at the nearby Yingding Tea Factory and Minhai Clothing Factory.

See also

Other prisons in Guangdong:

 Panyu Prison
 Foshan Prison
 Gaoming Prison
 Jiaoling Prison
 Lianping Prison

References

External links 
Official site of the Guangdong Prison Administrative Bureau - Jiangmen Prison

Prisons in Guangdong
1951 establishments in China
Jiangmen